{{DISPLAYTITLE:Rho3 Arietis}}

Rho3 Arietis (Rho3 Ari, ρ3 Arietis, ρ3 Ari) is the Bayer designation for a star in the northern constellation of Aries. It is faintly visible to the naked eye with an apparent visual magnitude of 5.63.

This is an astrometric binary system. The visible component is an F-type main sequence star with a stellar classification of F6 V. It is around 2.4 billion years old and has a high abundance of elements other than hydrogen and helium when compared to the Sun.

Name

This star, along with  δ Ari, ε Ari, ζ Ari, and π Ari, were Al Bīrūnī's Al Buṭain (ألبطين), the dual of Al Baṭn, the Belly. According to the catalogue of stars in the Technical Memorandum 33-507 - A Reduced Star Catalog Containing 537 Named Stars, Al Buṭain were the title for five stars : δ Ari as Botein, π Ari as Al Buṭain I, ρ3 Ari as Al Buṭain II, ε Ari as Al Buṭain III dan ζ Ari as Al Buṭain IV

References

External links
 HR 869 in the Bright Star Catalogue
 Image Rho3 Arietis

Aries (constellation)
F-type main-sequence stars
018256
013702
Arietis, 46
Arietis, Rho03
869
Astrometric binaries
Durchmusterung objects